Melissa Erica Maria O'Carroll Scott-Hayward (born 10 August 1990) is an Irish former cricketer who played as a right-handed batter and right-arm medium bowler. She appeared in 26 One Day Internationals and 22 Twenty20 Internationals for Ireland between 2008 and 2014. She played in the 2015 Women's Super 3s for Typhoons.

References

External links

1990 births
Living people
Irish women cricketers
Ireland women One Day International cricketers
Ireland women Twenty20 International cricketers
Typhoons (women's cricket) cricketers